Love on a Budget is a 1938 American comedy film directed by Herbert I. Leeds and starring Jed Prouty, Shirley Deane and Spring Byington. It was part of Twentieth Century Fox's Jones Family series of films. The Jones' eldest daughter Bonnie and her husband Herbert Thompson have money troubles, which their uncle attempts to help out with.

The film's sets were designed by the art directors Chester Gore and Bernard Herzbrun.

Cast

References

Bibliography
 Bernard A. Drew. Motion Picture Series and Sequels: A Reference Guide. Routledge, 2013.

External links
 

1938 films
1938 comedy films
American comedy films
Films directed by Herbert I. Leeds
20th Century Fox films
American black-and-white films
Films scored by Samuel Kaylin
1930s English-language films
1930s American films